The Ides of March is a 2011 American political drama film directed by George Clooney from a screenplay written by Clooney, Grant Heslov, and Beau Willimon. The film is an adaptation of Willimon's 2008 play Farragut North. It stars Ryan Gosling and Clooney alongside Philip Seymour Hoffman, Paul Giamatti, Marisa Tomei, Jeffrey Wright, and Evan Rachel Wood.

The Ides of March was featured as the opening film at the 68th Venice International Film Festival and at the 27th Haifa International Film Festival, and was shown at the 2011 Toronto International Film Festival. It received a wide theatrical release on 7 October 2011, and grossed $76 million worldwide. The film received positive reviews from critics and was chosen by the National Board of Review as one of the top ten films of 2011. Gosling earned a Golden Globe Award nomination for his performance, while Clooney, Heslov and Willimon were nominated for an Academy Award for Best Adapted Screenplay.

Plot
Stephen Meyers is the junior campaign manager for Governor of Pennsylvania Mike Morris, who is competing against Arkansas Senator Ted Pullman in the Democratic presidential primary. Both campaigns are vying for the endorsement of Senator Franklin Thompson, who controls 356 delegates; these would clinch the nomination for either candidate. At the Morris campaign's headquarters in Cincinnati, Meyers receives a call from Tom Duffy, Pullman's campaign manager; Duffy asks him to meet in secret at a local bar. Meyers calls his boss, Morris campaign manager Paul Zara, who does not answer. Meyers decides to meet with Duffy anyway and Duffy offers him a position in Pullman's campaign; Meyers refuses. When Zara calls back, Meyers does not tell him about the meeting.

Meyers starts a sexual relationship with Molly Stearns, an attractive intern whose father is the chairman of the Democratic National Committee. Meyers admits to an angry Zara that he met with Duffy, who said that Pullman will offer Thompson the position of Secretary of State in exchange for his endorsement. Zara and Meyers discuss the matter with Morris, saying they must make the same offer to Thompson. Morris refuses on principle, as he thoroughly disagrees with Thompson and his policies, and wants a "clean" campaign without such deals.

While Molly is sleeping, Meyers picks up her phone by mistake and finds that Morris is trying to call her. He discovers that Molly and Morris had a brief sexual liaison several weeks previously shortly after Molly arrived on the campaign in Iowa, and Molly is now pregnant with Morris' child. Molly needs $900 for an abortion, but cannot tell her father because her family is Catholic. Meyers helps her with the money but warns her not to tell anybody and fires her from the campaign to make the problem go away. Ida Horowicz, a reporter for The New York Times, reveals to Meyers that an anonymous source leaked his meeting with Duffy and that she plans to publish an article unless Meyers gives her the details about the Morris campaign's overtures to Thompson.

After dropping Molly off at the abortion clinic, Meyers goes to Zara for help. Zara reveals that he leaked the meeting to Ida with Morris's approval as a pretext for firing Meyers over his purported disloyalty. An angry and desperate Meyers offers his services to Duffy, who says he met with Meyers only to influence his opponent's operation, under the likelihood that Meyers either would come to work for him or would be fired for taking the meeting. Meyers offers to sell out Morris but Duffy declines, believing Thompson's endorsement of Pullman is assured. Meyers berates Duffy for using him, for which Duffy halfheartedly apologizes, and advises him to quit politics before he becomes a cynic like Duffy.

Having been told that Meyers had threatened to take down the campaign, Molly fatally overdoses on pills in a hotel room. Meyers comes across the scene and steals her phone. Unbeknownst to the Morris campaign, he meets with Thompson to set the conditions for his endorsement and his delegates. Meyers confronts Morris and gives him an ultimatum: Either give him Zara's job and offer Thompson the post of Vice President, or Meyers will go to the press with Molly's purported suicide note and expose the affair, all but assuring Morris's reputation tarnished and Pullman getting Thompson's endorsement. Morris relents, giving up what is left of his personal integrity, and meets Meyers' demands. Zara takes his firing philosophically and is amicable when he chats with Meyers at Molly's funeral.

Thompson officially endorses Morris, making him the de facto Democratic nominee. Promoted to senior campaign manager, Meyers is on the way to a remote TV interview with John King when Ida Horowicz ambushes him and says her next story will be about how Meyers delivered Thompson and his delegates and got his promotion. He reacts by having security bar Horowicz from entering the auditorium. Meyers takes his seat for the interview, just as Morris finishes a speech about how integrity and dignity matter. King then asks Meyers for insight as to how the events surrounding the primary unfolded.

Cast
 Ryan Gosling as Stephen Meyers, Morris' junior campaign manager.
 George Clooney as Mike Morris, Governor of Pennsylvania and a Democratic presidential candidate.
 Philip Seymour Hoffman as Paul Zara, Morris' campaign manager and Meyers's superior and mentor.
 Paul Giamatti as Tom Duffy, Ted Pullman's campaign manager.
 Evan Rachel Wood as Molly Stearns, an intern for Morris's campaign and Meyers' love interest.
 Marisa Tomei as Ida Horowicz, a reporter for the New York Times.
 Jeffrey Wright as Franklin Thompson, Democratic Senator from North Carolina.
 Max Minghella as Ben Harpen, a member of Morris's campaign staff.
 Jennifer Ehle as Cindy Morris, wife to Governor Mike Morris and the First Lady of Pennsylvania. 
 Gregory Itzin as former Senator Jack Stearns, father of Molly Stearns and the chairman of the Democratic National Committee.
 Michael Mantell as Ted Pullman, Senator from Arkansas and Morris's opponent in the Democratic primaries.

Production
In October 2010, Variety reported that Clooney signed on to produce, direct, and star in the film adaptation of Beau Willimon's Broadway play Farragut North. Exclusive Media Group, Cross Creek Pictures, Smoke House Pictures, and Leonardo DiCaprio's Appian Way Productions financed the film. Filming in Cincinnati, Ohio began in February 2011 in Downtown Cincinnati at Fountain Square, Over-the-Rhine historic district, Northside, Mount Lookout, Xavier University, other neighborhoods and at Miami University's Farmer School of Business and Hall Auditorium (Miami University and Hall Auditorium are located in Oxford, Ohio). Principal photography also took place in Downtown Detroit and Ann Arbor, Michigan. On 14 March, filming began at the University of Michigan and included 1,000 extras.

The theatrical release failed to recognize Cincinnati in the credits as a filming location. Producer and screenplay co-writer Grant Heslov said that "the omission of Cincinnati in the credits was an inadvertent mistake, something that slipped through the cracks." He also said that the credits would be corrected for the home release of the film.

Release
The Ides of March premiered on 31 August 2011 as the opening film of the 68th Venice International Film Festival. Sony Pictures Entertainment bought the distribution rights for the United States only, while Alliance Films bought Canadian distribution. Sony wanted Clooney to keep the play's title, but The Ides of March was picked as the title. The Ides of March was originally planned to have a limited release in December 2011 and a wide release in January 2012. However, Sony eventually moved the film's opening date to 14 October 2011. This was later moved again, to 7 October 2011.

Critical response
On Rotten Tomatoes, the film holds an approval rating of 84% based on 243 reviews, with an average rating of 7.38/10. The website's critics consensus reads: "While not exactly exposing revelatory truths, The Ides of March is supremely well-acted drama that moves at a measured, confident clip." On Metacritic the film has a weighted average score of 67 out of 100, based on 43 critics, indicating "generally positive reviews". Audiences polled by CinemaScore gave the film an average grade of "B" on an A+ to F scale.

Some critics gave the film mixed or even negative reviews. A. O. Scott of the New York Times wrote, "But it is difficult, really, to connect this fable to the world it pretends to represent. Whatever happens in 2012, within either party or in the contest between them, it seems fair to say that quite a lot will be at stake. That is not the case in The Ides of March, which is less an allegory of the American political process than a busy, foggy, mildly entertaining antidote to it."

Accolades

See also
 Politics in film

References

External links

 
 
 
 
 

2011 films
2011 drama films
2011 thriller drama films
2010s American films
2010s English-language films
2010s political drama films
2010s political thriller films
American films based on plays
American political drama films
American political thriller films
Appian Way Productions films
Columbia Pictures films
Cross Creek Pictures films
Exclusive Media films
Films about elections
Films directed by George Clooney
Films produced by George Clooney
Films produced by Grant Heslov
Films produced by Brian Oliver
Films scored by Alexandre Desplat
Films set in Cincinnati
Films shot in Cincinnati
Films shot in Michigan
Films shot in Ohio
Films with screenplays by George Clooney
Films with screenplays by Grant Heslov
Smokehouse Pictures films